Senator Cherry may refer to:

Deborah Cherry (born 1954), Michigan State Senate
John D. Cherry (born 1951), Michigan State Senate
R. Gregg Cherry (1891–1957), North Carolina State Senate